Chiyoko Sakamoto (1912–1994) was California's first Japanese American female lawyer.

Sakamoto was born on June 30, 1912 in Los Angeles, California to Hisamatsu and Kume Sakamoto. In 1938, she was admitted to practice law shortly after graduating from the American University Washington College of Law in Los Angeles, California. Sakamoto worked as a secretary during the four years of her legal studies. She became a legal assistant for a Japanese-American community leader after searching in vain for a law firm position.

During World War II, following the signing of Executive Order 9066, Sakamoto was imprisoned in the Granada Internment Camp in Prowers County, Colorado. Upon being released in 1947, she struggled yet again with finding employment. Through her struggles, she met Harvard University-educated African-American attorney Hugh E. Macbeth, Sr., who was a staunch defender of Japanese-Americans. He hired Sakamoto as an associate at his Los Angeles-based law firm. Sakamoto's coworkers included Eva M. Mack, a lawyer who worked with Macbeth, Sr. on the California Supreme Court case Davis vs. Carter that pertained to a housing discrimination suit filed by jazz musician Benny Carter. At the time, Sakamoto was unique in working for a non-Nisei law firm.

She eventually opened her own law firm in Little Tokyo, Los Angeles and was one of the founders of the Japanese-American Bar Association and the California Women's Bar. Sakamoto's husband, Tohru Takahashi, was a farmer in New Mexico, and they owned various farms in California (she even managed some of them while simultaneously taking on cases).

Sakamoto died in 1994.

See also 
 List of first women lawyers and judges in California

References 

1912 births
1994 deaths
Japanese-American internees
California lawyers
American jurists of Japanese descent
Washington College of Law alumni
20th-century American women lawyers
20th-century American lawyers